Trichonotus elegans, the long-rayed sand-diver, is a species of marine perciform fishes. It is found throughout the Indo-West Pacific. This species occurs in coastal reef slopes and deep outer reef lagoons where the channels create currents. It is a sociable species which is found in large groups each including a number of larger males. Its preferred habitat is substrates made up of sand and coral rubble). It is normally seen sitting still in the water column above sandy slopes. Their social grouping normally consist of a single male and a harem of around twelve females. Species in the genus Trichonotus are protogynous hermaphrodites. They are usually buried when the current is slack.

References

External links
 

Trichonotus
Fish described in 1984